Rashad Wright (born March 17, 1982) is an American former professional basketball player. He graduated from the University of Georgia and was selected by the Indiana Pacers with the final pick of the 2004 NBA draft. He played his whole professional career in Europe. He is currently an assistant coach/ head JV coach at the 5a private school Holland Hall.

External links
 Euroleague.net profile
 Eurobasket.com profile 
 French League profile
 

1982 births
Living people
African-American basketball players
Alba Berlin players
American expatriate basketball people in Belgium
American expatriate basketball people in Cyprus
American expatriate basketball people in France
American expatriate basketball people in Germany
American expatriate basketball people in Greece
American expatriate basketball people in Serbia
American expatriate basketball people in Turkey
American men's basketball players
Anadolu Efes S.K. players
Basketball players from Georgia (U.S. state)
BC Oostende players
Chorale Roanne Basket players
Georgia Bulldogs basketball players
Greek Basket League players
Indiana Pacers draft picks
Keravnos B.C. players
KK Hemofarm players
Panionios B.C. players
P.A.O.K. BC players
People from Statesboro, Georgia
Point guards
21st-century African-American sportspeople
20th-century African-American people